C4ISR may refer to:

 the C4ISR concept of Command, Control, Communications, Computers, Intelligence, Surveillance and Reconnaissance, the U.S. term for  C4ISTAR
  C4ISR Journal, a journal published by the Defense News Media Group
 the C4ISR architectural framework (C4ISR AF), now known as Department of Defense Architecture Framework (DoDAF)

See also
 Command and control
 RSTA
 STA sniper (USMC)
 Surveillance and Target Acquisition
 Artillery STA
 ISTAR
 Military intelligence
 Information Warfare
 Programs include Command Post of the Future (CPOF), C2PC, FBCB2, and MCS

de:C4ISR